United Shoe Machinery may refer to:
 British United Shoe Machinery, a British-based company (once a parent company to all the below)
 United Shoe Machinery Company of Canada, a Canadian-based company
 United Shoe Machinery Corporation, a U.S.-based corporation